This article contains information about the literary events and publications of 1538.

Events
December 20 – Pietro Bembo is made a Cardinal.

New books

Prose
Hélisenne de Crenne – Les Angoisses douloureuses qui procèdent d'amours
Sir Thomas Elyot – The dictionary of syr Thomas Eliot knyght (Latin to English)
Paracelsus – Astronomia Magna or the whole Philosophia Sagax of the Great and Little World
William Turner – Libellus de re herbaria (Handbook of Herbs)

Drama
John Bale
Kynge Johan, the earliest known English historical drama (in verse)
Three Laws of Nature, Moses and Christ, corrupted by the Sodomytes, Pharisees and Papystes most wicked
Georg Wickram – Der treue Eckart

Poetry

Hélisenne de Crenne – Les Angoisses douloureuses qui procèdent d'amours
Sir David Lyndsay – The Complaynte and Testament of a Popinjay
Clément Marot – Œuvres de Clément Marot

Births
December 10 – Giovanni Battista Guarini, Italian poet, dramatist and diplomat (died 1612)

Deaths
 unknown dates
Germain de Brie, French humanist scholar and poet (born 1490)
 Pierre Gringoire, French poet and playwright (born c.1475)

References

1538

1538 books
 
Renaissance literature
Early Modern literature
Years of the 16th century in literature